Alexander Vladimirovich Bumagin (born March 1, 1987) is a Russian professional ice hockey player who currently plays with Danish club, Frederikshavn White Hawks in the Metal Ligaen (DEN). He was selected by the Edmonton Oilers in the 5th round (170th overall) of the 2006 NHL Entry Draft.

Playing career
Bumagin played in Togliatti for two seasons. In 2004–05 he played in 7 games, scoring two goals and accumulating two penalty minutes. In 2005–06 he played in 40 games, scoring 9 goals and 14 assists for a total of 23 points, with 28 penalty minutes. During the 2010–11 campaign, Bumagin made a midseason transfer from Neftekhimik Nizhnekamsk to Metallurg Novokuznetsk.

Career statistics

Regular season and playoffs

International

Honours
 Continental cup:  2006 (With Lada Togliatti)

External links

1987 births
Living people
Atlant Moscow Oblast players
Avangard Omsk players
Avtomobilist Yekaterinburg players
Edmonton Oilers draft picks
Frederikshavn White Hawks players
HC Lada Togliatti players
Metallurg Novokuznetsk players
HC Neftekhimik Nizhnekamsk players
Sportspeople from Tolyatti
Russian ice hockey right wingers
Severstal Cherepovets players